Heathen Earth is a live album by the English industrial band Throbbing Gristle, released in 1980 through Industrial Records.

Background 

Tracks 1–8 document their performance 16 February 1980 at the Industrial Records studio in front of a small, invited audience.  The audience are all credited by name on the album, including Jonas Almquist of the Leather Nun, Monte Cazazza (who shot the video of the performance), Geoff Rushton and Jon Savage.  Included on the CD editions are bonus tracks taken from their 1980 7" singles "Adrenalin" and "Subhuman."

Release 

Heathen Earth was originally released in 1980 on the band's label Industrial Records.  The first pressing was limited to 785 copies on blue vinyl. The second pressing was on black vinyl.  The first CD release was in 1991.  Along with the rest of their albums, it was remastered by Chris Carter and re-released as a two-CD set in 2011.  This edition divided the album into nine tracks instead of eight (track 6 was split in two) and listed official titles for the first time.  The second CD consists of live recordings and single tracks.

Critical reception 

Pitchfork gave it an 8.0/10 grade, commenting that the album "[sounds] slightly stiff relative to the unhinged and abrasive live sound captured on the TG24 boxset, which archives their scalding live gigs before frequently hostile crowds with less fidelity but more heart. [...] But it's a testimony to their precision that, for all their influence, nobody quite sounds like them when they are truly on blast, as they are here." The Quietus called it "more cohesive and marshalled" than any of Throbbing Gristle's other live records, finishing that "it remains a brilliantly weird album."

Track listing

Personnel 
 Throbbing Gristle

 Genesis P-Orridge – bass guitar
 Cosey Fanni Tutti – cornet, lead guitar
 Peter Christopherson – cornet, tape
 Chris Carter – drum programming, synthesiser

 Technical

 "Sinclair/Brooks" – production
 Stan Bingo – engineering

Charts

See also 
 Throbbing Gristle live

References 

Live video albums
1980 live albums
1980 video albums
Throbbing Gristle live albums
Throbbing Gristle video albums
Albums with cover art by Hipgnosis